The Diamonds are a Canadian vocal quartet that rose to prominence in the 1950s and early 1960s with 16 Billboard hit records. The original members were Dave Somerville (lead), Ted Kowalski (tenor), Phil Levitt (baritone), and Bill Reed (bass). They were most noted for interpreting and introducing rhythm and blues vocal group music to the wider pop music audience. Contrary to a popular myth, the father of Tom Hanks was never a member of the group.

History

1950s
In 1953, Dave Somerville, while working as a sound engineer for the Canadian Broadcasting Corporation in Toronto, Ontario, Canada, met three other young singers. They decided to form a stand-up quartet called the Diamonds. The group's first performance was in the basement of St. Thomas Aquinas Church in Toronto singing in a Christmas minstrel show. The audience's reaction to the Somerville-led group was so positive that they decided that night they would turn professional.

After 18 months of rehearsal, they drove to New York and tied for 1st Place on Arthur Godfrey's Talent Scouts. The prize of being guest artist for a week on Godfrey's show led to a recording contract with Coral Records. Professional musician Nat Goodman became their manager. Coral released four songs, the most notable being "Black Denim Trousers & Motorcycle Boots", written by Jerry Leiber and Mike Stoller.

The next big step was an audition with Cleveland, Ohio, radio disc jockey, Bill Randle, who had aided in the success of some popular groups, such as The Crew-Cuts. Randle was impressed with the Diamonds and introduced them to a producer at Mercury Records who signed the group to a recording contract.

The Diamonds’ first recording for Mercury was "Why Do Fools Fall in Love" (originated by Frankie Lymon and the Teenagers), which reached No. 12 in the U.S. as their first hit, and their follow-up hit single, "The Church Bells May Ring" (originally by The Willows), reached No. 14 in the U.S.

The Diamonds' biggest hits were 1957's "Little Darlin'" (originally recorded by The Gladiolas, written by Maurice Williams) and "The Stroll" (1957), an original song written for the group by Clyde Otis, from an idea by Dick Clark.

Although they were signed to do rock and roll, Mercury also paired them with jazz composer and arranger Pete Rugolo, in one of his Meet series recordings. The album, entitled The Diamonds Meet Pete Rugolo, allowed them to return to their roots and do some established standards.

The group sang "Little Darlin'" and "Where Mary Go" in the film The Big Beat. They sang the theme song to the 1958 film, Kathy O’.

Their television appearances included the TV shows of Steve Allen, Perry Como, Vic Damone, Tony Bennett, Eddy Arnold, and Paul Winchell. They also appeared on American Bandstand.

In the late 1950s, Reed, Kowalski and Levitt left the group and were replaced by Mike Douglas, John Felten, and Evan Fisher.

1960s, 1970s and 1980s
Despite the ever-changing style of rock & roll and their Mercury contract expiring, the Diamonds continued touring the country. After Dave Somerville left the group in 1961 to pursue a folk singing career as "David Troy", he was replaced by Jim Malone. There were no more hit records by the Diamonds after Somerville left.

Throughout the 1960s and 1970s the Diamonds performed mostly in Las Vegas led, at first, by Mike Douglas, later being continued by Glenn Stetson. At one time, there were at least two groups performing under the Diamonds name, the other principally being led by John Felten until his death on May 17, 1982, in a plane crash. This created an issue in the late 1980s that ultimately went to court. The right to the use of the name "The Diamonds" was awarded to Gary Owens (a member of Felten's group) with the original members being allowed to use their name on special occasions each year. Owens, along with members Bob Duncan, Steve Smith (both former members of Lawrence Welk's band and television program), and Gary Cech, released an album in 1987, "Diamonds Are Forever", which contained two songs that entered the lower reaches of the Country Music Charts, "Just a Little Bit" and "Two Kinds of Women".

In 1986, Glenn Stetson and Dick Malono opened up Little Darlin's Rock and Roll Palace near Disney in Orlando, Florida which was a magical success for all the acts of that era to perform. The Country Music Network also starting videos of the groups that went on the TV network. In 1983, the Diamonds with Glenn Stetson were the first rock and roll group to go on the Country Music Network on a show called Nashville Now with Ralph Emory.

2000s and beyond
The Diamonds received national attention once again in 2000, when the original members were invited to sing in TJ Lubinsky’s PBS production of Doo-Wop 51, and again in the PBS production entitled Magic Moments - The Best of '50s Pop in 2004.

Stetson received a heart transplant in 2000, and died in 2003. Original member Kowalski died on August 8, 2010, from heart disease, at the age of 79.

In 2012 the Diamonds were listed as guest stars with The Fabulous Palm Springs Follies at the Plaza Theatre in Palm Springs, California.

Douglas died in a car accident on July 2, 2012, at age 78.

Somerville died on July 14, 2015, in Santa Barbara, California.

The Diamonds continue to tour to this day with the line-up of Gary Owens (baritone), Adam David Marino (tenor), Michael Lawrence (lead) and Jeff Dolan (bass), although none of the members are from the original group which had records on Mercury Records.

Original members
 Dave Somerville – Lead (died 2015) / Replaced by Jim Malone in 1961.
 Ted Kowalski – Tenor (died 2010) / Replaced by Evan Fisher in 1958.
 Phil Levitt – Baritone / Replaced by Mike Douglas in 1957.
 Bill Reed – Bass (died 2004) / Replaced by John Felten in 1958 (died 1982) / Replaced by Gary Cech until 1992 (voluntarily left the group).

Replacement members
 Glenn Stetson, lead vocalist. Replaced John Felten in 1968. Mike Douglas remained with the group as the only original member who recorded for Mercury in the 1950s and early 1960s. At this time the Diamonds consisted of Glenn Stetson (Canada), Harry Harding (Canada), Danny Rankin (USA), and Mike Douglas (Canada).
 Joe Derise, vocalist and composer joined in 1969.
 Jerry Honeycutt, was with John Felten during the mid-1970s, right up until Felten's death.
 Steve Smith, of The Lawrence Welk Show fame has been with the Diamonds since 1982.
 John Wagner, vocalist, singing tenor and playing tenor sax, joined Glen Stetson in 1983 and was with Stetson until 2003 when Stetson died. The Diamonds continued to perform until Stetson's death. It needs to be understood that the group that evolved when Somerville left the Diamonds in 1961 and Mike Douglas continued the group is the same group that Stetson kept going until his death in 2003. The historical continuation that began in 1968 ended with Stetson's death.
 Mike Douglas and Joe Derise rejoined the Diamonds in 1988. Derise eventually died and Mike Douglas (one of the original singers from the group's Mercury days) died in 2012.
 Bob Duncan, tenor, began singing with John Felten in 1979.
 Gary Owens, baritone, joined John Felten in 1975. He sings, plays saxophone and flute, and does most of the vocal arranging for the group.
 Gary Cech, bass, began singing with Bob Duncan in 1982 shortly after John Felten's death and left the group in 1992.
 Jerry Siggins, bass.
 Carson Church, Bass joined the Diamonds from 2001-3

Discography

Original albums
 The Diamonds (1957)
 America's Number One Singing Stylists (1957)
 The Diamonds Meet Pete Rugolo (Mercury, 1958) (with Pete Rugolo)
 America's Favorite Song Stylists (1959)
 Songs from the Old West (1959)
 Bandstand Boogie (1960)
 Pop Hits (1960)
 Diamonds Are Forever (1976)
 We’re Still Rockin' (1995)
 Solemnly Yours (1996)
 Silver Bells & Diamonds: Holiday Music from the Diamonds (1998)
 As Long as We're Singin'...and Swingin'! (2013)

Compilation albums
 Little Darlin''' (1981)
 The Diamonds Songbook (2007)
 The Stroll – 2 CD Set (2011)
 The Diamonds – 4 Classic Albums Plus (2015)

Singles

Film appearances
 The Big Beat (1958)

TV appearances
 The Eddy Arnold Show (1956)
 The Steve Allen Show'' (1957)

Awards and honours
 In 1984, the Canadian Juno "Hall of Fame" award by the Canadian Academy of Recording Arts and Sciences.
 In October, 2004, inducted into the Vocal Group Hall of Fame in Sharon, Pennsylvania.
 In 2006 inducted into the Doo-Wop Hall of Fame.

See also

 Canadian rock
 Music of Canada

References

External links
 The Current Diamonds
 Official Fan site
 'The Diamonds' Vocal Group Hall of Fame Page
 
 The Diamonds' singles discography

Canadian pop music groups
Canadian Music Hall of Fame inductees
Doo-wop groups
Mercury Records artists